Nicholas J. Hoff, (January 3, 1906, Magyaróvár, Hungary – August 4, 1997) was a Hungarian-born American engineer specializing in aeronautics and astronautics, which he taught at Stanford University.

Biography
Hoff spent his adolescence in Budapest, where he went to the same high school that had been attended by Leo Szilard, Eugene Wigner, and John von Neumann. After high school, he enrolled at ETH Zurich, where he studied under Aurel Stodola. He graduated with an engineering degree in 1928.

In 1938, Hoff moved to America, in order to study solid mechanics under Stephen Timoshenko, receiving his Ph.D. from Stanford University in 1942. His plans to return to Hungary were interrupted by the onset of the Second World War. In 1940, Hoff joined the Polytechnic Institute of Brooklyn as an instructor in aeronautical engineering, eventually becoming full professor in 1946 and head of the Department of Mechanical and Aerospace Engineering in 1950. He subsequently joined the faculty of Stanford University in the fall of 1957.

He served as the chair of the ASME Applied Mechanics Division (1955).

Awards and honors
 Worcester Reed Warner Medal, 1967
 Theodore von Karman Medal, 1972
 ASME Medal, 1974
 Daniel Guggenheim Medal, 1983
 Elected to the U.S. National Academy of Engineering
Fellow of the Society for Experimental Mechanics, 1987

References

Memorial Resolution: Nicholas J. Hoff (1906-1997) at Stanford University

1906 births
1997 deaths
Hungarian emigrants to the United States
20th-century American engineers
Stanford University faculty
Polytechnic Institute of New York University faculty
ASME Medal recipients
ETH Zurich alumni
Hungarian expatriates in Switzerland
People from Budapest